The Canadian province of Newfoundland and Labrador held municipal elections in its municipalities on September 27, 2005.

Listed are the results of selected municipal mayoral races in the province.

Conception Bay South

Corner Brook

Gander

Grand Falls-Windsor

Happy Valley-Goose Bay

Labrador City

Mount Pearl

Paradise

St. John's

Mayoral

Deputy Mayoral

Council

Stephenville
Election postponed for a week due to flooding

By-elections since 2005

St. John's Mayoral - 2008

St. John's Deputy Mayoral - 2008

St. John's Ward 4 - 2008

See also
Municipal elections in Canada
VOCM news

Newfoundland and Labrador municipal elections
2005
municipal elections
Newfoundland and Labrador municipal elections